Sturmpercht is an Austrian experimental, traditional folk and neofolk musical group inspired partially by indigenous alpine tradition.

Discography

Albums And EPs

Compilations

External links
Official Sturmpercht Site
 Official listing of Sturmpercht Percht label releases
video clips: Sturmpercht

Neofolk music groups
Austrian folk music groups